Helios Fernández (August 16, 1940 - October 2, 2004) was a Colombian / Spanish actor born in Barcelona, Spain on August 16, 1940  He considered his primary nationality to be Colombian as he lived in the country for the most part of his life and became a naturalized citizen. He died October 2, 2004 in Bogota, Colombia.

He was the son of the actor and painter Domingo Fernández Adeba, brother of musician and also actor Leandro Fernández and Paola Fernández.

He studied in "Instituto Departamental de Bellas Artes" in Cali and was one of the founders of "Teatro Experimental de Cali" with Enrique Buenaventura. He was very well known in Colombia for his TV appearances in ‘La casa de las dos palmas‘, ‘Garzas al amanecer‘, ‘Los pecados de Inés de Hinojosa‘, ‘Amantes del desierto‘, ‘El vuelo de la cometa‘ and others. He also acted on the stage and served as a television director.

Filmography 

 "Rosario Tijeras" (2005).... Old man
 "Colombianos, un acto de fe" (2004).... Oswaldo
 "El vuelo de la cometa" (2004)... Don Abraham
 "Humo en tus ojos" (2002)
 "Amantes del desierto" (2001)... Padre Morán
 "La caponera" (2000)... Càrdenas
 "Dos mujeres" (1997)
 "Cartas de amor"  (1997)
 "La mujer del presidente"  (1997)... Ricardo Díaz
 "La deuda"  (1997)
 "Las ejecutivas"  (1996)... Rafael Ortega Lleras (Guest star)
 "La otra mitad del sol"  (1996)... Ramón
 "Sobrevivir" (1995)... Genaro
 "Fiebre"  (1993)... Teófilo
 "Sangre de lobos"  (1992)... Anibal Millán
 "La casa de las dos palmas"  (1991).... Efrén Herreros (old)
 "Visa USA" (1986)

References

External links 
 Helios Fernández 
 http://www.diariooccidente.com.co/modules.php?op=modload&name=News&file=article&sid=70118&topic=54

Male actors from Barcelona
2004 deaths
1940 births
Colombian male film actors
Colombian male television actors
Colombian male telenovela actors
Spanish emigrants to Colombia